Tomonobu is a masculine Japanese given name.

Possible writings
Tomonobu can be written using many different combinations of kanji characters. Some examples:

友信, "friend, believe"
友伸, "friend, extend"
友延, "friend, extend"
友宣, "friend, announce"
知信, "know, believe"
知伸, "know, extend"
知延, "know, extend"
知宣, "know, announce"
智信, "intellect, believe"
智伸, "intellect, extend"
智延, "intellect, extend"
智宣, "intellect, announce"
共信, "together, believe"
共伸, "together, extend"
朋信, "companion, believe"
朋伸, "companion, extend"
朝信, "morning/dynasty, believe"
朝伸, "morning/dynasty, extend"
朝延, "morning/dynasty, extend"
朝宣, "morning/dynasty, announce"

The name can also be written in hiragana とものぶ or katakana トモノブ.

Notable people with the name
, Japanese footballer
, Japanese footballer
, Japanese politician
, Japanese philosopher
, Japanese video game designer
, Japanese samurai
, Japanese boxer
, Japanese footballer

Japanese masculine given names